Shanxi Datong University (SDU) is a university in Datong, Shanxi, China. It used to be a 2-year normal school to prepare teachers for elementary schools.

External links

 Shanxi Datong University Home Page
 Shanxi Datong University Home Page

Universities and colleges in Shanxi